Lee Na-eun (born May 5, 1999), also known mononymously as Naeun, is a South Korean singer and actress. She is a former member of South Korean girl group April. Besides from her group's activities, Naeun also has roles in A-Teen (2018), A-Teen 2 (2019) and Extraordinary You (2019). She previously hosted Inkigayo alongside Jaehyun of NCT and Minhyuk of Monsta X from October 2019 to February 2021.

Early life
Lee Naeun was born on May 5, 1999, and attended School of Performing Arts Seoul.

Career

2015–2019: Debut with April and acting career

Naeun was first introduced as a member of April by DSP Media on July 21, 2015. The group debuted on August 24 with the EP Dreaming and the title track "Dream Candy". Naeun made her official acting debut in the VR web drama "April Love" in 2016. She also made a minor appearance in KBS2's My Father is Strange in 2017.

In 2018 it was revealed that Naeun would be taking part in the soundtrack of SBS TV's Switch alongside April member Jinsol. The track, "Stars In The Night Sky" was released on May 2, 2018. It was also announced in 2018 that Naeun would play the lead role in teen drama A-TEEN (2018) and the second season of the series in 2019. Naeun also starred in MBC's school fantasy drama Extraordinary You, based on the hit Daum webtoon July Found by Chance.

2021–present: Disbandment of April and hiatus

On June 2, 2022, Naeun signed with Namoo Actors.

Discography

Filmography

Television series

Web series

Television shows

Radio shows

Awards and nominations

Notes

References

External links

 
 

1999 births
Living people
People from Daejeon
South Korean female idols
South Korean women pop singers
21st-century South Korean singers
South Korean dance musicians
April (girl group) members
21st-century South Korean women singers
South Korean television actresses
South Korean television personalities
South Korean web series actresses
21st-century South Korean actresses
DSP Media artists
School of Performing Arts Seoul alumni